Nguyễn Ngọc Anh may refer to:

 Nguyễn Ngọc Anh (swimmer) (born 1981), Vietnamese swimmer
 Nguyễn Ngọc Anh (footballer) (born 1988), Vietnamese football player

See also
 Nguyễn Thị Ngọc Anh (born 1985), Vietnamese footballer